Donald R. Elliott is a visual effects supervisor. He won at the 85th Academy Awards for his work on the film Life of Pi. This was in the category of Best Visual Effects. He shared his win with Erik-Jan de Boer, Guillaume Rocheron and Bill Westenhofer.

Selected filmography
 Star Trek IV: The Voyage Home (1986)
 Twins (1988)
 Back to the Future Part II (1989)
 Back to the Future Part III (1990)
 Hook (1991)
 Death Becomes Her (1992)
 Jurassic Park (1993)
 The Flintstones (1994)
 Congo (1995)
 Mars Attacks! (1996)
 The Lost World: Jurassic Park (1997)
 Deep Impact (1998)
 Jurassic Park III (2001)
 Minority Report (2002)
 Pirates of the Caribbean: Dead Man's Chest (2006)
 A Christmas Carol (2009)
 Life of Pi (2012)

References

External links

Living people
Year of birth missing (living people)
Best Visual Effects Academy Award winners
Special effects people
Place of birth missing (living people)